The Central District of Kuhbanan County is a district (bakhsh) in Kuhbanan County, Kerman Province, Iran. In the 2006 census, its population was 14,535, in 3,877 families.  The district has one city: Kuhbanan. The district has two rural districts (dehestan): Javar Rural District and Khorramdasht Rural District.

References 

Kuhbanan County
Districts of Kerman Province